Baraqueville-Carcenac-Peyralès is a railway station in Baraqueville, Occitanie, France. The station is located on the Castelnaudary – Rodez railway line. The station is served by TER (local) services operated by SNCF.

Train services
The following services currently call at Baraqueville:
local service (TER Occitanie) Toulouse–Albi–Rodez

References

Railway stations in Aveyron